Martin Harnik (born 10 June 1987) is an Austrian professional footballer who plays for German fifth-tier club TuS Dassendorf. He has represented the Austria national football team. He plays as a forward or as a right winger.

Family
Harnik was born in Hamburg in 1987, the youngest of three children who were raised in the Hamburg district of Kirchwerder. His father is from Styria in Austria, and his mother is from Hamburg.

Club career

Early career
Harnik started playing football in 1992 at SC Vier- und Marschlande. In early 2006, he joined the second team of Werder Bremen, playing in the third tier Regionalliga.

Due to a broken metatarsal bone, Harnik missed almost all of the first half of 2007. At the start of the 2007–08 season, the forward was promoted to the Bundesliga side of Werder Bremen, signing a contract until 2010.

On 15 August 2007, the 20-year-old made his debut for the professional team against Dinamo Zagreb, in the first leg of the third Champions League Qualification round (2–1).

His Bundesliga debut came ten days later, in a game against 1. FC Nürnberg (1–0). Being fielded in the 61st minute, he scored the winning goal for his side in the 69th minute. On 24 August 2009, it was announced that Harnik was able to leave his club SV Werder Bremen as a free agent, and six days later was loaned out to Fortuna Düsseldorf.

After one season at the 2. Bundesliga side, in which he was Fortuna's topscorer, with the Rhinelanders narrowly missing promotion to the Bundesliga, Harnik announced on 26 April 2010 that he would leave Düsseldorf.

VfB Stuttgart
In July 2010, he moved to VfB Stuttgart. In the first fixture of his second season with the club, Harnik scored the second goal of a 3–0 home win over Schalke. Harnik propelled his side to victory with a brace against SC Freiburg on 16 September 2011.

In the 2011–12 season, Harnik was Stuttgart's top scorer with 17 goals and eight assists. On 6 January 2012, he extended his contract with VfB Stuttgart until June 2016. Harnik netted twice in the final of the DFB-Pokal on 1 June 2013, but Stuttgart fell 3–2 to Bayern Munich and the Bavarians secured an unprecedented league, cup and European cup treble.

Hannover 96
In July 2016, Harnik joined Hannover 96. He scored 21 goals in 33 appearances during the 2016–17 season. He scored 11 goals in 32 appearances during the 2017–18 season.

Werder Bremen
In May 2018, Werder Bremen announced Harnik would return to the club for the 2018–19 season. Media reported he signed a contract until 2021 and estimated the transfer fee paid to Hannover 96 at around €2 million.

On 2 September 2019, Hamburger SV announced the signing of Harnik on a season-long loan deal.

In October 2020, after Harnik's return from loan, he agreed the termination of his contract with Werder Bremen.

TuS Dassendorf
Harnik moved down to fifth-division TuS Dassendorf on 7 October 2020, German transfer deadline day. This was because he lived near the club and wanted to play on the same team as his future brother-in-law, Mattia Maggio.

International career
Harnik, who also was eligible for Germany, opted to play for Austria, although he has never lived there, after having been nominated for the youth national teams of the ÖFB, not those of the German Football Association.

His debut came in a match against the Czech Republic in the Ernst Happel Stadium in Vienna on 22 August 2007 (1–1). After being on the pitch for just six minutes, he scored the equaliser in the 78th minute.

He was called up to Austria's squad for the Euro 2008. Harnik played in all three group games but the co-hosts were eliminated in the group stage.

On 2 September 2011, Harnik scored against Germany in a 6–2 loss at the Veltins-Arena in Gelsenkirchen. The win meant that Harnik's nation of birth secured qualification to Euro 2012.

He represented the national team at 2016 UEFA Euro.

Career statistics

Club

International goals
Scores and results list Austria's goal tally first, score column indicates score after each Harnik goal.

Honours
Werder Bremen
 DFB-Pokal: 2008–09
 UEFA Cup Runner-up: 2008–09

VfB Stuttgart
 DFB-Pokal Runner-up: 2012–13

References

External links

  
 
 
 

1987 births
Living people
People with acquired Austrian citizenship
Footballers from Hamburg
Austrian people of German descent
German people of Austrian descent
Austrian footballers
German footballers
Association football forwards
Austria youth international footballers
Austria under-21 international footballers
Austria international footballers
Hannover 96 players
VfB Stuttgart players
SV Werder Bremen players
SV Werder Bremen II players
Fortuna Düsseldorf players
Hamburger SV players
TuS Dassendorf players
Bundesliga players
2. Bundesliga players
3. Liga players
Regionalliga players
UEFA Euro 2008 players
UEFA Euro 2016 players